Soundwave Biennial Festival (formerly called the Soundwave Series) is a sound, art, and music festival that happens every two years for two months in San Francisco.

Overview
Soundwave is produced by the 501(c)3 non-profit Mediate Art Group. The festival features diverse local and international multimedia artists working with sound including noise artists, sound artists, improvisers, experimental musicians, composers, avant-garde musicians, vocalists, electroacoustic musicians, classical musicians and rock musicians. The festival focuses on new and unusual performances and art works, often in untraditional environments. Soundwave primarily showcases "sound art," but also explores disciplines such as media art, performance art, music, dance, and installation.

Artists
Soundwave created the well-received AudioBus series conceived by Soundwave founder and artistic director Alan So for its third season MOVE SOUND in 2008. It featured Bay Area singer Goh Nakamura, avant-cellist Zoe Keating, Odessa Chen and [ruidobello] and David Graves.

Other noted artists and musicians that have created performances at Soundwave include:
Moe! Staiano (Moe!Kestra!), Andrea Polli, Matt Davignon, Diana Burgoyne, (Rob Reger (Beno+Minnie with Aimee Friberg), Dana Gumbiner (of Deathray under electronic name Night Night), Danny Grody (of Tarentel performing with band The Drift) and Neal Morgan (of Joanna Newsom's Y Street Band and Golden Shoulders)

Soundwave was awarded "Best Sound Sculptures – Future Classic" by the editors of San Francisco Magazine in their Best of 2007 issue while being compared to San Francisco's Audium (Theater).

Soundwave seasons
Soundwave has had eight seasons: FREE SOUND 2004, SURROUND SOUND 2006 (curator and show featured by SPARK* on KQED-PBS), MOVE SOUND 2008 which included amplified skateboarding, sound drawing, holographic movies. ME'DI.ATE's fourth Soundwave season GREEN SOUND 2010 included performances in historic WWII Bunkers, churches, city streets and parks, and an artist-imagined environment Illuminated Forest. Its fifth season Soundwave HUMANITIES 2012 has been called epic, glorious and with distinct and daring artists. Season six explored WATER in 2014 in the midst of a California drought. The seventh season ARCHITECTURE occurred in 2016 exploring the rapid transformation of San Francisco's changing cityscapes and its implications. Its eight season in 2018 is INFRASTRUCTURE exploring Bay Area and global networks provoking ideas around isolation amid interconnectivity; environmental degradation and mass consumption of electronics; the politics of energy infrastructures, fossil fuels and renewables; the movement of goods and services across roads, bridges, railways, channels and ports; the often invisible protocols that affect our daily lives.

Locations
Soundwave events have occurred in galleries, museums, and unusual and iconic locations in and around San Francisco. They have included:
 Grace Cathedral
 California Academy of Sciences
 de Young Museum
 Legion of Honor
 Battery Townsley
 San Francisco Zen Center
 California College of the Arts
 San Francisco Art Institute
 Dolby Cinema
 SPUR
 The Exploratorium
 Yerba Buena Gardens
 Civic Center Plaza
 Ocean Beach
 The Lab
 Alterspace
 Contemporary Jewish Museum
 Gray Area Foundation for the Arts
 Intersection for the Arts

See also
List of electronic music festivals
Experimental rock

References

External links 
 Soundwave Festival site
 ME'DI.ATE Art Group

Music festivals established in 2004
Festivals in the San Francisco Bay Area
Music festivals in California
2004 establishments in California
Electronic music festivals in the United States
Electroacoustic music festivals